Ustatochoerus is an extinct genus of oreodont of the family Merycoidodontidae, endemic to North America. It lived during the late Oligocene to Miocene, 24–10.3 mya, existing for approximately 14 mya. Fossils are widespread through the central and western United States.

Taxonomy
Species of Ustatochoerus include U. leptoscelus, U. calaminthus, U. major, U. medius, U. profundus, and U. californicus.

Description
Ustatochoerus was a herbivore with a short face, tusk-like canine teeth, heavy body, long tail, short feet, and four-toed hooves.

References

 
Miocene even-toed ungulates
Miocene extinctions
Miocene mammals of North America
Arikareean
Hemingfordian
Barstovian
Clarendonian
Hemphillian
Fossil taxa described in 1941
Prehistoric even-toed ungulate genera